Cheng Yonghua (born September 1954) is a Chinese diplomat who served as Ambassador to Japan from 2010 to 2019.

Life and career
Cheng was born in Changchun, Jilin in September 1954.

Beginning in 1977, he served in several posts in the Chinese Embassy in Japan, including secretary, director, and counsellor. On February 28, 2010, the Chinese president Hu Jintao appointed Cheng the Chinese Ambassador to Japan, succeeding Cui Tiankai.

Cheng was the Chinese Ambassador to Malaysia from 2006 to 2008, and the Chinese Ambassador to South Korea between October 2008 to January 2010.

References

1954 births
Living people
People from Changchun
Wako University alumni
Sōka University alumni
Ambassadors of China to Japan
Ambassadors of China to South Korea
Ambassadors of China to Malaysia